"For the Love of Money" is a soul, funk song that was written and composed by Kenneth Gamble, Leon Huff, and Anthony Jackson; it was recorded by Philadelphia soul group The O'Jays for the album Ship Ahoy. Produced by Gamble and Huff for Philadelphia International Records, "For the Love of Money" was issued as a single in late 1973 (see 1973 in music), with "People Keep Tellin' Me" as its B-side. The single peaked at number three on the U.S. Billboard R&B chart, and at No. 9 on Billboard's Pop Singles chart in spring 1974. Though the album version of the song was over seven minutes long, it received substantial radio airplay. The song's title comes from a well-known Bible verse, 1 Timothy 6:10: "For the love of money is the root of all evil: which while some coveted after, they have erred from the faith, and pierced themselves through with many sorrows." (This translation is from the King James Version of the Bible.) The song was also used as the opening theme song for NBC’s The Apprentice.

Production
Anthony Jackson played bass guitar on the song. One day during fall 1973, producer/keyboardist Leon Huff was leading the members of the MFSB rhythm section and Jackson through a rehearsal. Sigma Sound Studios owner/engineer Joe Tarsia noticed that Jackson had a wah-wah pedal attached to his Fender Precision Bass. Tarsia decided to run Jackson's bassline through a phaser, giving it a swishing sound and later mixed in echo. During the final mixing of the track, Kenny Gamble impulsively reached over to the echo button and added echo to Jackson's opening riffs.

Credits
 K. Gamble – producer, composer, lyricist 
 Leon Huff – producer, composer, lyricist 
 A. Jackson – composer, lyricist

Awards and accolades
"For the Love of Money" was nominated for the 1975 Grammy Award for Best R&B Vocal Performance – Duo, Group or Chorus, losing to "Tell Me Something Good" by Rufus.

Despite the 1975 snub, in 2016 "For the Love of Money" was inducted into the Grammy Hall of Fame.

Chart history

Weekly charts

Year-end charts

Cover versions

 The song was covered by Todd Rundgren's band Utopia on their 1982 album Swing to the Right.
 The song was covered by the funk-punk outfit Defunkt on their 1982 album Thermonuclear Sweat.
 A cover version recorded by Erroll Starr was nominated for the 1987 Juno Award for "Best R&B/Soul Recording" (see Juno Awards of 1987).
 It was covered by BulletBoys on their eponymous 1988 album, and a video was made for the song.
 It was covered by World Saxophone Quartet on their 1989 album, Rhythm and Blues.
 It was covered by Carole Davis, under the title "Serious Money," on her 1989 album Heart of Gold.
 A medley of "For the Love of Money" and Stevie Wonder's "Living for the City" was recorded by Troop, LeVert, and Queen Latifah. The medley is featured prominently in Mario Van Peebles's 1991 film New Jack City, and it appears on the film's soundtrack.
 Rare Blend covered the song for the Driven: Motion Picture Soundtrack in 2001.
 The song was covered by Katey Sagal, and it is featured on her 2004 album Room.
 Backstreet Boys recorded a version of this song for their Never Gone album, but it was not released.
 The song was covered by Queensrÿche on their 2009 album Take Cover.
 The song was covered by The Dynamics on their 2011 album 180,000 Miles and Counting.
 The song was covered by Tackhead on their 2014 album of the same name, For the Love of Money.
 The song was covered by Nektar on their 2012 album "A Spoonful of Time."

Samples

In 1978, Jackson would reprise the signature riff for "The Poppy Girls Theme" on The Wiz (soundtrack). "For the Love of Money" is sampled in Grandmaster Melle Mel's 1985 single "Step Off," and Funky Four's "King Heroin" (1983). It has also been sampled by Marky Mark and the Funky Bunch's single "I Need Money" and Charli Baltimore's single "Money." The Happy Mondays's "Rave On" (1989) intro was also based on the opening riff to "For the Love of Money." The British R&B singer/rapper Jentina sampled the money line for the chorus of her debut single "Bad Ass Strippa" in 2004. The rhythm and vocals are also used as the main backing track to Bone Thugs N' Harmony's 1995 single "Foe tha Love of $," featuring Eazy E. The song was sampled for the Papoose featuring Remy Ma single "What's My Name" in 2013. The song was sampled by Dr. Dre on the 2015 album Compton in the eponymous song "For the Love of Money."

References

Sources
Jisi, Chris: "The Anthony Jackson Interview." Bass Player Magazine, Spring 1990.
Jisi, Chris: "The Anthony Jackson Interview." Bass Player Magazine, Summer 1990.
Jisi, Chris: "Spontaneous Combustion: Anthony Jackson & Michel Camilo." Bass Player Magazine, May 2002.

External links
[ Song review] on Allmusic
 https://nektarsmusic.com/music/a-spoonful-of-time/

1973 songs
1973 singles
1974 singles
1991 singles
The O'Jays songs
LeVert songs
BulletBoys songs
Philadelphia International Records singles
Songs written for films
Songs written by Kenny Gamble
Songs written by Leon Huff